Nitric oxide synthetase may refer to:

 Nitric oxide synthase
 Nitric-oxide synthase (NAD(P)H-dependent)